Suez Cement or Asmant el-Suweis []; is an Egyptian football club based in Suez. It was a member of the Egyptian Premier League. Suez Cement is one of the latest clubs in world football as it was founded in 1995 which continued for the cement company and the name of the same club.

Current squad 2007–08

Football clubs in Egypt
1995 establishments in Egypt
Sports clubs in Egypt
Association football clubs established in 1995
Works association football clubs in Egypt